El Ménia is a district in El Menia Province, Algeria. It was named after its capital, El Ménia.

Municipalities 
The district is further divided into 2 municipalities:
 El Ménia
 Hassi Gara

References 

 
Districts of Ghardaïa Province